The Portoscuso Wind Farm is a proposed wind power project in Portoscuso, Sardinia, Italy. It will have 39 individual wind turbines with a nominal output of around 2.3 MW each which will deliver up to 90 MW of power, enough to power over 70,000 homes, with a capital investment required of approximately €100 million. The wind farm will have an electricity production of 185 GWh per year that will save the emission of 130,000 tonnes of carbon dioxide.

References

Proposed wind farms in Italy